Neomillspaughia is a genus of plants in the family Polygonaceae with three known species in Southeastern Mexico and Central America. 
It was first described by S.F. Blake in 1921. He named the reclassified genus after Charles Frederick Millspaugh in recognition of Millspaugh's extensive collecting in Southeastern Mexico and the West Indies.

References

Polygonaceae genera